Gala is a Canadian documentary film, directed by Michael McKennirey and John N. Smith and released in 1982. A portrait of the Canadian Dance Spectacular, a 1981 show at the National Arts Centre in Ottawa, Ontario at which eight Canadian professional dance companies all performed on stage together for the first time, the film blends both dance performance segments and backstage footage.

The participating dance companies were the National Ballet of Canada, Les Grands Ballets Canadiens, the Royal Winnipeg Ballet, le Groupe de la Place Royale, the Danny Grossman Dance Company, the Toronto Dance Theatre, Winnipeg Contemporary Dancers and the Anna Wyman Dance Theatre.

The event had been planned for a television broadcast on CBC Television, which was not able to proceed due to a strike by NABET, the union representing CBC production technicians; instead, the National Film Board of Canada stepped in to film it as a documentary.

The film had a budget of $810,934 (.

The film premiered on April 30, 1982 at the NAC. It subsequently received a CBC Television broadcast in September.

The film received a Genie Award nomination for Best Feature Length Documentary at the 4th Genie Awards in 1983.

References

Works cited

External links
 

1982 films
1982 documentary films
Canadian documentary films
Canadian dance films
1980s English-language films
Films shot in Ottawa
National Film Board of Canada documentaries
Documentary films about dance
1982 directorial debut films
1980s Canadian films